Nir Etzion (lit. Etzion Meadow) is a religious moshav shitufi in northern Israel. Located between Ein Hod and Ein Hawd near Atlit, at the foot of Mount Carmel, it falls under the jurisdiction of Hof HaCarmel Regional Council.

History
The village was established in 1950 as a kibbutz by refugees from Kfar Etzion and Be'erot Yitzhak (which had been captured by the Jordanian and Egyptian armies during the 1948 Arab-Israeli War) as well as Holocaust survivors and members of the Ahdut and Tikva kvutzot on land that had belonged to the newly depopulated Palestinian village Ayn Hawd. It was affiliated with Hapoel HaMizrachi.

In 1953 it converted to a moshav shitufi.

References

External links
Official website 

Moshavim
Former kibbutzim
Religious Israeli communities
Populated places established in 1950
Populated places in Haifa District
1950 establishments in Israel